Inga Jacobi (2 July 1891 – 12 October 1937) was a German-born ballet dancer and choreographer who settled in Norway.

Biography
She was born in Magdeburg to Bernhard Theodor Albert Jacobi (1856–1914) and Ragna Hansen Mjøen (1858–1939).
She was a cousin of  actor and theatre director Fridtjof Mjøen  (1897–1967).  

She studied ballet in Dresden, where she trained with  music educator  Émile Jaques-Dalcroze (1865–1950). After the death of her father, she moved with her Norwegian born mother to Kristiania in 1915. She married art historian Henrik Grevenor in 1919. 

She established her own ballet school in 1916. Her modern dance expression gained a foothold on established stages. 
Among her students were the actress Ragnhild Hald (1896–1975) and the ballet dancer and choreographer Gerd Kjølaas (1909–2000). She died in Germany in 1937.

References

1891 births
1937 deaths
People from Magdeburg
German emigrants to Norway
Norwegian ballerinas